Brooklyn Park is a  public park in Portland, Oregon's Brooklyn neighborhood, in the United States. The park was acquired in 1949.

Friends of Brooklyn Park sponsors the Brooklyn Park Summer Program, which has included a large water slide.

Marcia Donahue's sculpture Tête à Tête à Tête was installed in 1996.

See also
 List of parks in Portland, Oregon

References

External links
 

1949 establishments in Oregon
Brooklyn, Portland, Oregon
Parks in Portland, Oregon
Protected areas established in 1949